Maurice Marcel Frederic Condé-Williams OBE (16 January 1885 – 16 November 1967) was an English cricketer and Royal Navy officer who served with distinction in the First World War.  He was educated at Brighton College, where in 1899 he played for the college cricket team. As a cricketer, his batting and bowling styles are unknown.

Condé-Williams was serving in the Royal Navy in 1908 aboard . He made his debut for Devon in the 1911 Minor Counties Championship against Dorset.  He played for Devon from 1911 to 1913, representing them in 10 matches. He later made his first-class debut for the Royal Navy in 1913 against the Army. Condé-Williams served in the First World War, and following the conclusion of the war he was knighted with an OBE for his services as Secretary to Vice-Admiral Sir Sydney Fremantle.  Condé-Williams held the temporary rank of Acting Paymaster-Commander and the permanent rank of Paymaster Lieutenant-Commander. He later played his second and final first-class match for the Royal Navy in 1923 against the Army. In his two first-class matches, he scored 54 runs at a batting average of 13.50, with a high score of 30.

He died in Chelsea, London, on 16 November 1967.

References

External links
Maurice Condé-Williams at ESPNcricinfo
Maurice Condé-Williams at CricketArchive

1885 births
1967 deaths
People educated at Brighton College
English cricketers
Devon cricketers
Royal Navy cricketers
Royal Navy officers
Royal Navy personnel of World War I
Officers of the Order of the British Empire
English people of French descent
Place of birth missing